Vanderlei Luxemburgo da Silva (born 10 May 1952) is a Brazilian professional football coach and former player. He is currently a free agent.

A left wingback, Luxemburgo represented Flamengo, Internacional and Botafogo before retiring in 1980. He subsequently became a coach and led Palmeiras, Corinthians, Cruzeiro and Santos to Série A titles, winning the tournament five times, a record total. In 2005 he worked at Real Madrid, but was dismissed in December of that year.

His surname is after revolutionary Rosa Luxemburg.

Playing career
Born in Nova Iguaçu, Rio de Janeiro, Luxemburgo played the most of his youth football for Botafogo, but made his senior debut with Flamengo in 1972; at the club, he was mainly a backup to Júnior. He left Fla in 1978 to Internacional, but remained at the club for just one year before returning to his first team Botafogo. He retired in 1980, aged 28, due to a knee injury.

Coaching career

Early career
Before being a first team trainer, Luxemburgo spent the rest of the 1980 campaign with Antônio Lopes' Olaria, but not being officially under contract with the club. He was also Lopes' assistant at America-RJ (1981) and Vasco da Gama (1981–82).

Luxemburgo's first coaching experience occurred in 1983, with Campo Grande; he only lasted eight matches at the club, being sacked after altercations with the board. In the same year, he also managed Rio Branco-ES, winning the Campeonato Capixaba with the side.

In 1984, after managing Friburguense, Luxemburgo then moved abroad to Saudi Arabia's Al-Ittihad; initially Joubert's assistant, he was in subsequently charge of the club. He was at the helm of Democrata-GV in the following year, but only lasted three months.

Luxemburgo subsequently rejoined Lopes' staff at Fluminense in 1986, where he acted as head coach of the under-20 squad. In the following year, he replaced Pinheiro in charge of America-RJ. Another stint in the Middle East following, being again assistant of Joubert at Al-Shabab.

Luxemburgo returned to Brazil in October 1988, after being invited to manage Bragantino, winning the 1990 Campeonato Paulista. He subsequently worked at Flamengo, Guarani and Ponte Preta before being hired by Palmeiras in 1993; he led the latter club to both the state and league championships in 1993 and 1994.

When Luxemburgo left in 1995 for Flamengo, Palmeiras' performance was visibly affected, and when he came back in 1996 (after a short period at Paraná), the team won the São Paulo State championship again. After a brief stint at Santos, in 1998 he went to Corinthians and won the league that year. He left the club in the following year, to join the Brazilian Football Confederation.

Luxemburgo coached Brazil after the 1998 FIFA World Cup until the end of 2000 Olympics. Most notably, he is known for centering his play around Rivaldo. In 1999 the Seleção won the Copa América undefeated. However, he is also remembered for the disastrous performance at the 2000 Olympic Games in Sydney, where Brazil lost 1–2 in overtime to gold medal winners Cameroon despite having a two men advantage in that game. He was often blamed at this tournament for leaving out Romário, who had gone on national television, pleading his case to play in the tournament.

In 2001, he went back to Corinthians and won yet another State Championship. In 2003, he led Cruzeiro Esporte Clube to win the Brazilian National League. Even more impressively, the club won two of the three competitions (the Campeonato Mineiro and the Copa do Brasil) without losing a single match. The following year he led Santos to win the Brazilian Championship.

Luxemburgo also stirred up controversy by having a one-way transmission device on a forward of his club team during a match. He said that the Cameroon match inspired him to create a device in order to tell his players where and when to attack. The CBF ruled days later that such electronic devices were illegal, but did not penalize him for using it in that match.

Real Madrid
Luxemburgo was hired as Real Madrid's coach from Santos in the second half of the 2004/2005 season when Mariano García Remón was dismissed from the job. He led Real Madrid to seven consecutive league wins, putting them back in the title race but ended up losing it four points behind FC Barcelona.

In the following season, Real Madrid started brightly. However, the introduction of a new formation (the Magic Rectangle, a 4–2–2–2 formation), combined with multiple injury issues and poor performances began Luxemburgo's downfall. Calls for him to resign were intensified after a humiliating 0–3 home defeat to long-time rivals, Barcelona.

He was sacked on 5 December 2005, Real Madrid announced Juan Ramón López Caro would be his successor.

Santos
Luxemburgo signed, for the third time, a contract with Santos, leading the club to the 2006 São Paulo State Championship and in fourth place of the Série A.

He continued with Santos in 2007 and won the São Paulo State Championship again. He also saw Santos through the semi-finals of the 2007 Copa Libertadores, winning all the matches in the group stage and eliminating strong teams, such as Caracas in the round of 16 and América in the quarter-finals, before losing to Grêmio in the semis. Later Luxemburgo finished second in the Série A. In both years, 2006 and 2007, he led Santos to a Copa Libertadores berth.

Palmeiras return
At the end of 2007, Luxemburgo left Santos. He signed with Palmeiras in 2008, and won the São Paulo State Championship for the third consecutive time.
 
With Palmeiras he was eliminated from the Sudamericana by Argentinos Juniors and from the Brazilian Cup by Sport Recife the eventual champions. In the 2008 Série A he reached fourth place with Palmeiras in a very competitive season, earning the club a spot in the Libertadores.

Luxemburgo remained with Palmeiras in 2009. He managed the team to a successful campaign in the São Paulo State Championship but lost to Santos in the semi-finals. In the Copa Libertadores he conquered a place in the Round of 16 by defeating Colo-Colo 1–0 in Santiago, with Cleiton Xavier scoring a last minute long-range goal in the angle of Colo-Colo's goalkeeper. Palmeiras defeated Sport Recife on penalties in the Round of 16, but were eliminated by an away goal from Nacional from Uruguay drawing both matches, by 1–1 at home and 0–0 away.

In the 2009 Série A Luxemburgo started well in the competition, but after an incident involving young striker Keirrison, Luxemburgo was dismissed from Palmeiras in the seventh round of the competition.

Santos return

He was re-signed as Head Coach of Santos after a one and a half-year absence on 17 July 2009 and on 7 December 2009 the coach quit Santos, finishing 12th in the league, to sign with Atlético Mineiro.

Flamengo  (3rd spell) / Grêmio 
On 5 October 2010, Vanderlei Luxemburgo was named as a new head coach of Flamengo, and managed the club until February 2012.

On 21 February 2012, it was announced that Luxemburgo was taking charge of Grêmio Foot-Ball Porto Alegrense until 31 December 2012. On 29 April 2013, after getting involved in a fight in the game between Grêmio and Huachipato for the Libertadores Cup, Luxemburgo was suspended for six games in this competition.

On 29 June 2013, Luxemburgo was dismissed by directors of Grêmio.

Fluminense

On 30 July 2013, Luxemburgo signed with carioca side Fluminense FC, that dismissed, one day earlier, Abel Braga. Luxemburgo defended his predecessor, calling him "winner", and lamented his resignation, a "culture of brazilian football". The coach, to resume, wants his players "wrathful with losses". On 12 November Fluminense FC sacked Luxemburgo after a long winless streak. At the time Fluminense stood in 18th place in the Brazilian Série A and was under relegation threat.

Flamengo (4th spell)
On 23 July 2014, Luxemburgo was named as a new head coach of Flamengo with the mission of taking lot of an unprecedented low points record at the start of the Brazilian national league (Brasileiro). Luxa was ultimately successful in leading the club's struggle against relegation, earning important points in the tournament and taking the team to the upper half of the table.

Cruzeiro return 
On 2 June 2015, Vanderlei Luxemburgo was named as a new head coach of Cruzeiro Esporte Clube, but was dismissed after poor results on 31 August.

Tianjin Songjiang
On 23 September 2015, Vanderlei Luxemburgo was named as a new head coach of Tianjin Songjiang, for the 2016 season. He was sacked the following 5 June, with the club only in the eighth position, and was subsequently replaced by Fabio Cannavaro.

Sport Recife

On 29 May 2017, Luxemburgo was named as the new head coach Sport Recife, and won the year's Campeonato Pernambucano with the club. On 26 October, after a poor run of form, he was relieved from his duties.

Vasco da Gama
On 8 May 2019, Luxemburgo was named head coach of Vasco da Gama, agreeing to a contract until the end of the year. After helping the side avoid relegation, he departed the club on 13 December.

Palmeiras (5th spell)
On 15 December 2019, Luxemburgo signed a two-year contract with Palmeiras, returning to the club after 11 years. He won the 2020 Campeonato Paulista with the club, being this the fifth time winning the competition with the club and ninth overall, and surpassed Lula as the most successful head coach of the tournament.

On 14 October 2020, after a 1–3 home defeat against Coritiba, Luxemburgo was sacked.

Vasco da Gama return 
On 31 December 2020, it was announced the return of Luxemburgo to Vasco da Gama on a contract running until the end of the 2020 Campeonato Brasileiro Série A season.

Cruzeiro (third spell)
On 3 August 2021, Luxemburgo returned to Cruzeiro, with the club now in the Série B.

Managerial statistics

Honours

Player
Flamengo
Campeonato Carioca: 1972, 1974, 1978

Manager

Club
Rio Branco-ES
Campeonato Capixaba: 1983

Bragantino
Campeonato Brasileiro Série B: 1989
Campeonato Paulista: 1990

Palmeiras
Campeonato Paulista: 1993, 1994, 1996, 2008, 2020
Campeonato Brasileiro Série A: 1993, 1994
Torneio Rio – São Paulo: 1993

Santos
Torneio Rio – São Paulo: 1997
Campeonato Brasileiro Série A: 2004
Campeonato Paulista: 2006, 2007

Corinthians
Campeonato Brasileiro Série A: 1998
Campeonato Paulista: 2001

Cruzeiro
Campeonato Mineiro: 2003
Copa do Brasil: 2003
Campeonato Brasileiro Série A: 2003

Atlético Mineiro
Campeonato Mineiro: 2010

Flamengo
Campeonato Carioca: 2011

Sport
Campeonato Pernambucano: 2017

International
Brazil
Copa América: 1999

See also
List of Brazil national football team managers

References

External links
 

1952 births
Living people
People from Nova Iguaçu
Brazilian footballers
Campeonato Brasileiro Série A players
Brazilian football managers
Brazilian expatriate football managers
Expatriate football managers in Saudi Arabia
Expatriate football managers in Spain
Expatriate football managers in China
1999 Copa América managers
1999 FIFA Confederations Cup managers
Campeonato Brasileiro Série A managers
La Liga managers
China League One managers
CR Flamengo footballers
Sport Club Internacional players
Botafogo de Futebol e Regatas players
Campo Grande Atlético Clube managers
Rio Branco Atlético Clube managers
Friburguense Atlético Clube managers
Ittihad FC managers
Esporte Clube Democrata managers
America Football Club (RJ) managers
Clube Atlético Bragantino managers
Guarani FC managers
CR Flamengo managers
Associação Atlética Ponte Preta managers
Sociedade Esportiva Palmeiras managers
Paraná Clube managers
Santos FC managers
Sport Club Corinthians Paulista managers
Brazil national football team managers
Cruzeiro Esporte Clube managers
Real Madrid CF managers
Clube Atlético Mineiro managers
Grêmio Foot-Ball Porto Alegrense managers
Fluminense FC managers
Tianjin Tianhai F.C. managers
Sport Club do Recife managers
Brazilian expatriate sportspeople in Spain
Brazilian expatriate sportspeople in Saudi Arabia
Brazilian expatriate sportspeople in China
Association football defenders
CR Vasco da Gama managers
Sportspeople from Rio de Janeiro (state)